A general election was held in the U.S. state of New Jersey on November 3, 2015. Primary elections were held on June 2. The only state positions up in this election cycle were all 80 seats in the New Jersey General Assembly and one Senate special election in the 5th Legislative District. In addition to the State Legislative elections, numerous county offices and freeholders in addition to municipal offices were up for election. There were no statewide ballot questions this year though some counties and municipalities may have had a local question asked. Non-partisan local elections, some school board elections, and some fire district elections also happened throughout the year.

State Legislature
The entire Senate is up in years ending in 1, 3, and 7; as there is no gubernatorial election coinciding with the years ending in 5 or 9 in this decade, the General Assembly races are the highest races listed on ballots for the first time since 1999. A very low turnout was expected due to the lack of Presidential, Congressional, or gubernatorial elections on the ballot this year. The predictions turned out to be true as the 22% turnout was the lowest percentage recorded in recent state history.

Senate
One special election was held in the 5th Legislative District to fill the remaining term of Donald Norcross. Norcross resigned in November 2014 following his election to Congress. In December 2014, 5th District Democrats appointed former Assemblywoman Nilsa Cruz-Perez to the seat. Cruz-Perez was unopposed in the Democratic primary and faced no challengers in the special election. The Democratic Party holds a majority of seats in the Senate with 24 seats; the Republican Party holds 16 seats. The results of this election did not affect the standings of either party in the upper house.

General Assembly

All 80 seats in the General Assembly were up for election this year. In each Legislative district, there are two people elected; the top two winners in the general election are the ones sent to the Assembly. Typically, the two members of each party run as a team in each election. In the 2013 election, Democrats captured 48 seats while the Republicans won 32 seats. At the time of the general election, there were two vacancies: One in the 5th District resulting from Democrat Angel Fuentes's resignation on June 30, 2015, and one in the 24th District resulting from Republican Alison Littell McHose's resignation on October 17, 2015. Ultimately four Democrats defeated four incumbent Republicans leading to the Democrats controlling 52 of 80 seats in the 2016–17 Assembly session, the highest percentage they held since 1979.

Overall results
Summary of the November 3, 2015 New Jersey General Assembly election results:

List of races

District 1

|- style="background-color:#F6F6F6" 
! style="background-color: #3333FF" | 
| colspan="6" | One Democratic gain from Republican
|-

District 2

|- style="background-color:#F6F6F6" 
! style="background-color: white" | 
| colspan="6" | One Democratic and one Republican hold
|-

District 3

District 4

District 5

Incumbent Angel Fuentes originally ran in the Democratic primary but withdrew his candidacy in June 2015 when he became a deputy county clerk in Camden County. Fuentes and Marianne Holly Cass were replaced on the Democratic ballot by Arthur Barclay and Pat Jones and Ralph Williams was replaced by Keith Walker on the Republican ticket.

District 6

Robert Esposito originally won a spot on the Republican ticket in the general election but was replaced on the ballot by Claire Gustafson.

District 7

District 8

District 9

District 10

District 11

|- style="background-color:#F6F6F6" 
! style="background-color: #3333FF" | 
| colspan="6" | Two Democratic gains from Republican
|-

District 12

Anthony Washington originally won a spot on the Democratic ticket in the general election but was replaced on the ballot by Robert P. Kurzydlowski.

District 13

District 14

District 15

District 16

On election night, the returns initially showed incumbent Republican Donna Simon ahead of Democrat Andrew Zwicker. That night, Zwicker delivered a concession speech though later returns that night put him ahead of Simon. After all provisional ballots were counted in the four counties comprising the district, Simon conceded on November 16. Zwicker becomes the first Democrat to ever represent the 16th legislative district.

|- style="background-color:#FFFFFF" 
! style="background-color: #3333FF" | 
| colspan="6" | One Republican hold, one Democratic gain from Republican
|-

District 17

District 18

District 19

Reyes Ortega originally won a spot on the Republican ticket in the general election but was replaced on the ballot by Jesus Varela.

District 20

District 21

District 22

District 23

District 24

District 25

District 26

District 27

District 28

District 29

District 30

Jimmy Esposito originally won a spot on the Democratic ticket in the general election but was replaced on the ballot by Lorna Phillipson.

District 31

District 32

District 33

District 34

Louis Rodriguez originally won a spot on the Republican ticket in the general election but withdrew his candidacy from the general election due to a federal job.

District 35

District 36

District 37

District 38

Anthony Cappola initially dropped out of the race on October 1 following the discovery of a controversial satirical book entitled Outrageous! written by Cappola. Bergen County Republicans picked attorney Fernando Alonso to replace Cappola on the ballot pending the allowance of the replacement candidate on the ballot. The Republicans unexpectedly dropped the effort to have the candidate replaced on October 13 and Cappola later announced his intention to continue in the race.

District 39

District 40

References

External links
New Jersey Department of State - Division of Elections 2015 Election Information
New Jersey elections, 2015 - Ballotpedia